The Inner Six, also known as the Six, the Six founders, or the founding members of the European Union, refers to Belgium, France, Germany, Italy, Luxembourg, and the Netherlands, the six founding member states of the European Communities, now succeeded by the European Union.

History
The Inner Six are those who responded to the Schuman Declaration's call for the pooling of coal and steel resources under a common High Authority. The six signed the Treaty of Paris creating the European Coal and Steel Community on 18 April 1951 (which came into force on 23 July 1952). Following on from this, they attempted to create a European Defence Community: with the idea of allowing West Germany to rearm under the authority of a common European military command, a treaty was signed in 1952. However the plan was rejected by the Senate of France, which also scuppered the draft treaty for a European Political Community (which would have created a political federation to ensure democratic control over the new European army). 

Dependency on overseas oil and the steady exhaustion of coal deposits led to the idea of an atomic energy community (a separate Community was favoured by Monnet, rather than simply extending the powers of the ECSC as suggested by the Common Assembly). However, the Benelux countries (Belgium, the Netherlands, and Luxembourg) and Germany desired a common market. In order to reconcile the two ideas, both communities would be created. Thus, the six went on to sign the Treaties of Rome in 1957, establishing the European Economic Community and the European Atomic Energy Community. The institutions of these communities would later be merged in 1967, leading to them collectively being known as the "European Communities".

Inner Six and Outer Seven
The "Inner Six" were in contrast to the outer seven group of countries who formed the European Free Trade Association rather than engage in supranational European integration. Five of the Outer Seven would themselves later join the European Communities.

The six would continue in their co-operation until 1973 when they were joined by two of the Outer Seven (UK and Denmark) and Ireland.

Enlargement and Brexit: Nine, Ten, Twelve, Fifteen, and beyond
The events of the 1956 Suez Crisis showed the United Kingdom that it could no longer operate alone, instead turning to the United States and the European  Communities. The United Kingdom, along with Denmark, Ireland and Norway, applied for membership in 1960. However, then–French President Charles de Gaulle saw British membership of the Community as a Trojan horse for United States interests, and hence stated he would veto British membership. The four countries resubmitted their applications on 11 May 1967 and with Georges Pompidou succeeding Charles de Gaulle as French President, the veto was lifted. Negotiations began in 1970 and two years later the accession treaties were signed with all but Norway acceding to the Community (Norway rejected membership in a 1972 referendum).
In 1981 Greece joined the European Community, bringing the number to ten. After its democratic revolution, Portugal would also leave EFTA to join the Communities in 1986, along with Spain. The twelve were joined by Sweden, Austria and Finland (which had joined EFTA in 1986) in 1995, leaving only Norway and Switzerland as the remaining members of the original outer seven, although EFTA had gained two new members (Iceland and Liechtenstein) in the intervening time. On the other hand, membership of the Communities, now the European Union (EU), had reached 28. With the approval of Brexit, which saw the United Kingdom leave the EU on 31 January 2020 after a June 2016 referendum and political negotiations, the EU currently has 27 members.

Modern "inner" groups
Today, there are still some groups within the European Union integrating faster than others, for example the eurozone and Schengen Area (see: Opt-outs in the European Union). The Treaty of Lisbon includes provisions for a group of countries to integrate without the inclusions of others if they do not wish to join in as, following the rejection of the European Constitution, some leaders wished to create an inner, more highly integrated federal Europe within a slower-moving EU.

The Inner Six are today among the most integrated members of the EU.

 – member

 – non-member

See also 
 Arraiolos meeting
 Big Four (Western Europe)
 Craiova Group
 Enlargement of the European Union
 EU Med Group
 European Economic Area
 European Free Trade Association
 EU three
 G6 (EU)
 Multi-speed Europe
 Opt-outs in the European Union
 Schengen Agreement
 Visegrád Group

References 

 History of the European Union
 Enlargement of the European Union
 Geography of the European Union
 Organizations established in 1951
1951 establishments in Europe